Metrobus Nationwide Sdn Bhd (doing business as Metrobus) is a privately owned public transport company in the Klang Valley that was formed in 1992. It is based in Subang Jaya. It is the second largest stage bus (regular or trunk bus route) and feeder bus operator in Kuala Lumpur after RapidKL. Metrobus Nationwide owns a huge fleet of Nissan Diesel, Hino and Mercedes Benz buses but the buses are below service standards.

References

External links

Bus companies of Malaysia
Transport in the Klang Valley
Organizations established in 1992
1992 establishments in Malaysia
Privately held companies of Malaysia